Vasundhara Raje Scindia (born 8 March 1953) is an Indian politician, who has held two terms as the chief minister of Rajasthan. She was previously a minister in the Union Cabinet of Atal Bihari Vajpayee and was India's first Minister of Micro, Small and Medium Enterprises. She is currently one of the national vice presidents of the Bharatiya Janata Party (BJP). A member of the Scindia family, she is also the matriarch of the Bamraulia family of Dholpur.

Early life 
Vasundhara Raje singh was born on 8 March 1953 in Bombay (now Mumbai). She is the daughter of Vijayaraje Scindia-Shinde and Jivajirao Scindia-Shinde, Maharaja of Gwalior, members of the prominent Scindia royal Maratha family.

Raje completed her school education at Presentation Convent School in Kodaikanal, Tamil Nadu, and later graduated with economics and political science degrees from the Sophia College for Women, Mumbai.

Personal life
She married Maharaj Rana Hemant Singh, of the royal Dholpur family, on 17 November 1972, but they separated a year later. Her son, Dushyant Singh, was elected to the Lok Sabha from her former constituency, Jhalawar.
Her siblings are Yashodhara Raje Scindia, a former industries minister of Madhya Pradesh, the late Madhavrao Scindia, the late Padmavati Raje "Akkasaheb" Burman (1942–64), who married Kirit Deb Burman, the last ruling Maharaja of Tripura, and Usha Raje Rana (b. 1943) who married into the Rana family of Nepal.

Children
She has one son Dushyant Singh a four-time member of Parliament through Loksabha and the Yuvraj of Dholpur.

Political career
In 1984, Raje entered the Indian political system. Initially, she was made a member of the national executive of the newly formed Bharatiya Janata Party. She was also elected as a member of the 8th Rajasthan Assembly from Dholpur. In the same year, she was appointed vice president of the Yuva Morcha, Rajasthan BJP.

Membership of legislative assembly
 1985-90 member, 8th Rajasthan legislative assembly from Dholpur
 2003-08 member, 12th Rajasthan legislative assembly from Jhalrapatan
 2008–13, 13th Rajasthan legislative assembly from Jhalrapatan
 2013–18, member, 14th Rajasthan legislative assembly  from Jhalrapatan
2018–present, member, 15th Rajasthan legislative assembly from Jhalrapatan

Membership of parliament
 1989-91 : member, 9th Lok Sabha, from Jhalawar. 
 1991-96 : member, 10th Lok Sabha
 1996-98 : member, 11th Lok Sabha
 1998-99 : member, 12th Lok Sabha
 1999-03 : member, 13th Lok Sabha

Positions held
 1985-87 : vice-president, Yuva Morcha BJP, Rajasthan
 1987 : vice-president, BJP, Rajasthan
 1990-91 : member, Library Committee, member, Consultative Committee, Ministries of Commerce and Tourism
 1991-96 : member, Consultative Committees, Ministries of Power, Science and Technology, Environment and Tourism
 1996-97 : member, Committee on Science and Technology, Environment and Forests, Member, Consultative Committees, Ministries of Power, Science and Technology and Tourism
 1997-1998 : joint secretary, BJP Parliamentary Party
 1998-99 : Union minister of state, External Affairs
 13 October 1999 – 31 August 2001: Union minister of state (Independent Charge), Small Scale Industries and Agro & Rural Industries; Department of Personnel and Training; Department of Pensions and Pensioners' Welfare in the Ministry of Personnel, Public Grievances and Pensions; Department of Atomic Energy and Department of Space
 1 September 2001 – 1 November 2001: Union minister of state, Small Scale Industries; Personnel, Training, Pensions, Administrative Reforms & Public Grievances; Department of Atomic Energy; and Department of Space (Independent Charge) 2 November 2001-
 29 January 2003 – 8 December 2003: Union minister of state, Small Scale Industries; Personnel, Training, Pensions, Administrative Reforms & Public Grievances; Planning; Department of Atomic Energy; and Department of Space (Independent Charge) 14 November 2002 -
 14 December 2003 – president, BJP, Rajasthan
 8 December 2003 – 8 December 2008: chief minister, Rajasthan
 2 January 2009 – 8 December 2013: leader of opposition, Rajasthan legislative assembly
 8 December 2013 – 11 December 2018: chief minister, Rajasthan
  11 January 2019 : national vice president of Bharatiya Janata Party

Works
 Vasundhara Raje, Rajasthan Gaurav Yatra
 Vasundhara Raje, Bhamashah Yojana
 Satyam Kumar and Vasundhara Raje, iStart Rajasthan
 Vasundhara Raje, Jal Swavlamban
 See More Schemes of Vasundhara Raje

Achievements
In 2007, she received the "Women Together Award" from the UNO for services rendered towards the self-empowerment of women.

In 2018, she received the 'Best Chief Minister of the Year' Award at the 52nd Skoch Summit.

Book 
A book on the life of Vasundhara Raje named Vasundhara Raje aur Vikasit Rajasthan was written by the historian Vijay Nahar and published by Prabhat Prakashan.

See also
First Vasundhara Raje ministry

References

|-

|-

|-

External links 

1953 births
Living people
Chief ministers from Bharatiya Janata Party
Scindia dynasty of Gwalior
Chief Ministers of Rajasthan
Sophia College for Women alumni
Women in Rajasthan politics
Rajasthan MLAs 1985–1990
People from Jhalawar district
Rajasthani people
India MPs 1989–1991
India MPs 1991–1996
India MPs 1996–1997
India MPs 1998–1999
India MPs 1999–2004
Lok Sabha members from Rajasthan
Women chief ministers of Indian states
Rajasthan MLAs 2013–2018
Rajasthan MLAs 2003–2008
Rajasthan MLAs 2008–2013
Leaders of the Opposition in Rajasthan
Indian female royalty
Bharatiya Janata Party politicians from Rajasthan
20th-century Indian women politicians
20th-century Indian politicians
21st-century Indian women politicians
21st-century Indian politicians
Women members of the Lok Sabha
Women union ministers of state of India
Rajasthan MLAs 2018–2023